Acrocephalomyia torulosa is a species of fly in the genus Acrocephalomyia of the family Ropalomeridae.

Range 
Acrocephalomyia torulosa is only known from the type locality, Dourados, in the Mato Grosso do Sul state of Brazil.

References 

Diptera of South America
Insects described in 2016
Sciomyzoidea